HSD3B1 is a human gene that encodes for a 3beta-hydroxysteroid dehydrogenase/delta(5)-delta(4)isomerase type I or hydroxy-delta-5-steroid dehydrogenase, 3 beta- and steroid delta-isomerase 1. While it can carry out the same function as HSD3B2, it localizes primarily to different tissues, such as the placenta and nonsteroidogenic tissues. Its requirement for the production of progesterone by the placenta, which has a vital role in pregnancy, may be one reason why no disease based on mutations in this gene has been identified to date, besides prostate cancer.

Clinical significance
The 1245C allele encodes for a missense and hyperactive enzyme that increases extragonadal androgen synthesis and is associated with poorer outcomes after androgen deprivation therapy in prostate cancer.

References

Further reading